William Ennis may refer to:

 William Ennis (U.S. Army brigadier general) (1841–1938), United States Army officer, father of William Peirce Ennis, grandfather of William P. Ennis
 William Peirce Ennis (1878–1968), United States Army officer
 William P. Ennis (1904–1989), United States Army officer, son of the above
 Bill Ennis-Inge (born 1973), American football coach and player